Muhammad Ziauddin (1938 – 29 November 2021) was a Pakistani journalist, economist and historian.

Biography
He was born in 1938 in Madras, British India. He got his BSc in Pharmacy from the University of Dhaka and a master's degree in journalism from University of Karachi in 1964. He worked for Pakistan Economist, Morning News, The Muslim, Dawn, The News International and The Express Tribune. 
"His career spanned five newspapers over sixty years", According to a major Pakistani TV news channel. 

He had also served as president of South Asia Free Media Association from 2002 to 2006.

Reportedly, former Prime Minister of Pakistan Benazir Bhutto would often call Ziauddin for his advice on economic issues facing Pakistan.

Death and legacy
He died on 29 November 2021 at his residence in Islamabad.

One of his fellow journalists, Qaiser Butt, paid him his tribute by saying that he used to write balanced and objective articles.

References

1938 births
2021 deaths
Pakistani journalists
Pakistani male journalists
Pakistani economists
20th-century Pakistani historians
People from Islamabad
People from Chennai
University of Karachi alumni
University of Dhaka alumni